Die Musikforschung is a quarterly peer-reviewed academic journal of musicological which since 1948 is published on behalf of the Gesellschaft für Musikforschung by Bärenreiter. The editors-in-chief are Panja Mücke (Hochschule für Musik und Darstellende Kunst Mannheim), Manuel Gervink (Hochschule für Musik Carl Maria von Weber), and Friedrich Geiger (University of Hamburg). The journal covers music history, theory, and practice. A review section discusses German and foreign-language books and scholarly editions of sheet music. Reports provide summaries of relevant congresses and conferences.

Abstracting and indexing
The journal is abstracted and indexed in:
Arts and Humanities Citation Index
Current Contents/Arts & Humanities
L'Année philologique
Modern Language Association Database
RILM Abstracts of Music Literature
Scopus

References

External links

Music journals
Publications established in 1948
German-language journals
Quarterly journals